Voroshilov (feminine: Voroshilova) is a Russian-language surname. It may refer to:

Ekaterina Voroshilova, spouse of Kliment Voroshilov, formally First Lady of the Soviet Union in 1953-1960
Kliment Voroshilov  (1881–1969), Marshal of the Soviet Union
Marina Voroshilova (1922-1986), Soviet virologist
Viktor Voroshilov (1926-2011), Soviet footballer
Vladimir Voroshilov (1930—2001), Russian TV personality

Russian-language surnames